Matt King (born July 13, 1983) is a former professional American, Canadian, and Arena Football linebacker.

He was signed as an un-drafted rookie free agent by the New York Jets in 2007. He later signed with the NFL's Pittsburgh Steelers. He played his college football at the University of Maine where he was a consensus First Team All-America selection. King has also been a member of the Hamilton Tiger-Cats of the CFL, the Georgia Force of the AFL, and the Manchester Wolves of the now defunct AF2 League.

References

1983 births
Living people
American football linebackers
Maine Black Bears football players
Georgia Force players
Manchester Wolves players
Players of American football from Massachusetts
People from Stoughton, Massachusetts